Igor Abakoumov (born 30 May 1981 in Berdyansk, Ukraine) is a Belgian former professional road bicycle racer of Ukrainian origin. Abakoumov became a naturalized Belgian citizen on 15 September 2001. He turned professional in 2002. Abakumov was left in limbo by his former team, when the sponsors pulled the plug on funds following a drugs scandal.

Major results

1999
 1st Overall GP Général Patton
2001
 2nd Omloop van de Westhoek
 3rd GP Claude Criquielion
2002
 1st Stage 2 Okolo Slovenska
 5th Flèche Ardennaise
2003
 1st Romsée-Stavelot-Romsée
 1st Stage 4 Volta a Tarragona
 1st Stage 5 International Cycling Classic
 2nd Trofee van Haspengouw
 5th Ronde van Drenthe
 5th Hel van het Mergelland
 3rd Rund um Düren
 8th GP Stad Zottegem
2004
 1st Profronde van Fryslan (with 21 others)
 8th Route Adélie
2005
 2nd Nokere Koerse
 3rd Grand Prix de Wallonie
 6th Classic Loire Atlantique
 8th Paris–Brussels
 9th Druivenkoers-Overijse
2006
 1st Stage 2 Tour de l'Ain
 5th Classic Loire Atlantique
 6th Brabantse Pijl
 6th Dwars door Vlaanderen
 8th Cholet-Pays de Loire
 8th Hel van het Mergelland
 8th Le Samyn
 9th Flèche Hesbignonne
 10th Grand Prix d'Ouverture La Marseillaise
2008
 5th GP Stad Zottegem
 9th Le Samyn

References

People from Berdiansk
1981 births
Living people
Belgian male cyclists
Ukrainian male cyclists
Sportspeople from Zaporizhzhia Oblast